Noah Quinten Abid (born 30 January 2000) is a former Tunisian-Dutch football midfielder. He last played for VV DOVO in the Dutch Derde Divisie.

Club career
Abid made his Eerste Divisie debut for Jong Ajax on 20 November 2018 in a game against Jong FC Utrecht as a 64th-minute substitute for Jasper ter Heide. He moved at the end of the season to join Jong Almere City. In February 2021 he joined CS Sfaxien, the club of former Ajax player Hatem Trabelsi who had made the move the other way around from Tunisia to the Netherlands.

In June 2021 he was released from the club without having made any league appearances. He returned to the Netherlands joining DOVO and competing in the Derde Divisie, before announcing his retirement from football for personal reasons.

International career
On 30 May 2019, it was announced that Abid had been called up by Alain Giresse as part of the 30-man preliminary squad for the Tunisia national football team, joining their training facility in Croatia for the friendly fixture against Iraq on 7 June 2019 ahead of the 2019 Africa Cup of Nations.

References

External links
 

2000 births
Footballers from The Hague
Dutch people of Tunisian descent
Living people
Dutch footballers
Tunisian footballers
Association football midfielders
Jong Ajax players
CS Sfaxien players
VV DOVO players
Eerste Divisie players
Dutch expatriate footballers
Tunisian expatriate footballers
Expatriate footballers in Belgium
Expatriate footballers in England
Expatriate footballers in Tunisia